The Texas Southern Tigers represent Texas Southern University in Houston, Texas, in intercollegiate athletics. They field sixteen teams including men and women's basketball, cross country, golf, and track and field; women's-only bowling, soccer, softball, tennis, and volleyball; and men's-only baseball and football. The Tigers compete in the NCAA Division I and are members of the Southwestern Athletic Conference.

Sports sponsored

Baseball

The baseball program's first season was 1965, and it has been a member of the NCAA Division I Southwestern Athletic Conference since the start of the 1999 season. Its home venue is MacGregor Park, owned by the city of Houston. The program has appeared in 5 NCAA Tournaments. It has won five conference tournament championships and no regular season conference titles.

Men's basketball

The men’s basketball program has appeared in ten NCAA Tournaments, the most in the conference. Their combined record is 3–10, tying them with Alcorn State for the most wins by a SWAC school in the tournament.

Women's basketball

The women’s basketball team has appeared in the NCAA Division I women's basketball tournament once. The Lady Tigers have a record of 0–1.

Football

The football team plays in the NCAA's Division I FCS as a member of the Southwestern Athletic Conference (SWAC). In 2012, the Tigers moved into the new Shell Energy Stadium, built for the city's Major League Soccer team, the Houston Dynamo.  It replaced the Alexander Durley Sports Complex as the home of Tiger football. 60 former members of the football program have gone on to play in the NFL.

Gallery

References

External links